Covent Garden is a London Underground station serving Covent Garden and the surrounding area in the West End of London. It is on the Piccadilly line between Leicester Square and Holborn stations and is in Travelcard Zone 1. The station is at the corner of Long Acre and James Street and the street-level concourse is a Grade II listed building.

History
The station was planned by the Great Northern and Strand Railway (GN&SR), which had received parliamentary approval for a route from Wood Green station (now Alexandra Palace) to Strand in 1899. After the GN&SR was taken over by the Brompton and Piccadilly Circus Railway (B&PCR) in September 1901, the two companies came under the control of Charles Yerkes' Metropolitan District Electric Traction Company before being transferred to his new holding company, the Underground Electric Railways Company of London (UERL) in June 1902. To connect the two companies' planned routes, the UERL obtained permission for new tunnels between Piccadilly Circus and Holborn. The companies were formally merged as the Great Northern, Piccadilly and Brompton Railway following parliamentary approval in November 1902. The station was opened by the Great Northern, Piccadilly and Brompton Railway on 11 April 1907, four months after services on the rest of the line began operating on 15 December 1906.

In 1929, Covent Garden was suggested for closure in connection with the extension of the Piccadilly line: the elimination of less-busy stations in the central area would improve both reliability and journey times for long-distance commuters, though the closure did not proceed.

In 2011, English Heritage gave the station frontage Grade II listed status, on account of it being a good example of Leslie Green's architecture.

The station today

Design

Like the rest of the original GNP&BR stations, the street level station building and platform tiling were designed by Leslie Green in the Modern Style (British Art Nouveau style). As is commonplace with other Central London stations Green designed, the station building is a classic red 'Oxblood' building which has two elevations fronting onto the end of James Street and Long Acre. The platform wall was tiled with two shades of yellow and white tiling which formed geometric shapes along with three blank spaces to incorporate the station name. As part of Transport for London's investment programme, the ageing tiling dating back from the station's opening was replaced in 2010 in a like-for-like basis, retaining the look and feel of the platforms.

Platform level tiling

The stations along the central part of the Piccadilly line, as well as some sections of the Northern line, were financed by Charles Yerkes, and are famous for the Leslie Green designed red station buildings and distinctive platform tiling. Each station had its own unique tile pattern and colours.

Access

Covent Garden station is one of the few stations in Central London for which platform access is only by lift or an emergency spiral staircase with 193 steps. There are four lifts that give access to street level, although a final flight of stairs from the lifts to the platforms means that the station is wheelchair-inaccessible.

Proximity to Leicester Square
The journey between Leicester Square station and Covent Garden takes only about 20 seconds, and measures only , the shortest distance between two adjacent stations on the Underground network. The stations are so close that a pedestrian standing halfway between them on Long Acre can see both tube stations by turning around 180°.

As of 2022, the cash fare for the journey is £6.30, or £36.21 per mile. In 2015, at £29.81/mi, the journey was more expensive per unit distance than the Venice-Simplon Orient Express. Posters at the station give details of the alternative methods of getting to and from Covent Garden using surrounding stations.

Services and connections
Train frequencies vary throughout the day, but generally operate every 3–7 minutes in both directions. As a part of the Piccadilly line, the train is served by Night Tube on Friday and Saturday nights.

Folklore
It is said that the ghost of actor William Terriss (murdered in 1897) haunts the station. It is claimed that he used to visit a bakery demolished when the station was built. The last reported sighting of Terriss was in 1972.

Notes and references

Notes

References

Bibliography

External links

 London Transport Museum Photographic Archive
 
 
 
 
 
 
 
 

Piccadilly line stations
London Underground Night Tube stations
Tube stations in the City of Westminster
Former Great Northern, Piccadilly and Brompton Railway stations
Railway stations in Great Britain opened in 1907
Tube station
Leslie Green railway stations
1907 establishments in England